Beautiful News is an album by Christian worship artist Matt Redman. Two songs, "Take it To The Streets" and "All Over the World", were written in collaboration with Martin Smith, lead singer of Christian band Delirious? while "A Greater Song" was written in collaboration with worship artist Paul Baloche.

"All Over The World" was covered by Tree63 on their album Worship Volume One: I Stand For You.

"You Never Let Go" was covered by Rebecca St. James on her 2011 album I Will Praise You, Stellar Kart on their album Everything Is Different Now, Jeremy Camp on We Cry Out: The Worship Project in 2010, AJ Michalka of Aly & AJ and James Denton for their film, Grace Unplugged, and by the Mexican band Rojo in Spanish, as "No Me Soltarás" on Con el Corazón en la Mano in 2007.

Track listing

 "If You Know You're Loved By the King" contains a hidden remix track of "Beautiful News".

Production 
 Doubledutch – producers 
 Louie Giglio – executive producer 
 Les Moir – executive producer 
 Brad O'Donnell – executive producer
 Curtis Schwartz – recording 
 John Barnett – recording assistant
 Josiah Bell – recording assistant
 Robert Marvin – recording assistant
 Paul Moak – recording assistant 
 Jan Kotzmann – string engineer 
 Cenda Kotzmann – assistant string engineer 
 F. Reid Shippen – mixing 
 Andy Selby – additional editing
 Greg Calbi – mastering 
 Jess Chambers – A&R administration
 Holly Meyers – A&R administration 
 Jan Cook – creative direction 
 Tim Frank – art direction 
 Benji Peck – design, illustration 
 Andy Hutch – photography

References

External links
Beautiful News E-Card

2006 albums
Matt Redman albums